Xu Yousheng (born August 1957) is a Chinese politician. He is a representative of the 19th National Congress of the Chinese Communist Party and a member of the 19th Central Committee of the Chinese Communist Party.

Biography
Xu was born in Minqing County, Fujian, in August 1957. 

During the late Cultural Revolution, he was a sent-down youth in his home-county from 1975 to 1977. He worked at Fuzhou Rubber Factory for a year, After resuming the college entrance examination in 1978, he entered Xiamen University, majoring in Chinese language and literature. He joined the Chinese Communist Party (CCP) in November 1985. After graduating in 1982, he was assigned to the Secretary Bureau of the Overseas Chinese Affairs Office of the State Council, where he was eventually prompted to deputy director in 2001.

In 2012, he was appointed head of the Propaganda Department of the CCP Hunan Provincial Committee and admitted to member of the Standing Committee of the CCP Hunan Provincial Committee, the province's top authority. He became secretary-general of the CCP Hunan Provincial Committee in 2015, but having held the position for one year. In 2016, he was made vice chairman of Hunan Provincial People's Congress.

In 2017, he was recalled to the original Overseas Chinese Affairs Office of the State Council as deputy director, and one year later became director, and concurrently serving as deputy head of the United Front Work Department of the CCP Central Committee.

References

1957 births
Living people
People from Minqing County
Xiamen University alumni
People's Republic of China politicians from Fujian
Chinese Communist Party politicians from Fujian
Members of the 19th Central Committee of the Chinese Communist Party